The Brantford Civic Centre is a 2,952-seat arena in Brantford, Ontario, Canada. It was built as a Canadian Centennial project in 1967. The Civic Centre is located in the downtown core, adjacent to Elements Casino Brantford.

The Pittsburgh Penguins used the arena for preseason camp and exhibition games in September, 1967. Previously, the arena hosted the Brantford Alexanders of the Ontario Hockey League from 1978–1984, and the OHL All-Star game in 1982. The Brantford Smoke of the Colonial Hockey League played there from 1991 to 1998. It was the former home to the Brantford Golden Eagles of the Ontario Hockey Association, and is the home to the Brantford Blast of Major Hockey League. The 2008 Allan Cup was played there from April 14–19, which saw the home town Brantford Blast win the 100th Allan Cup, beating the Bentley Generals 3–1.
 
In 2015, the building underwent a $400,000 renovation to replace the original wooden seats, and make the building handicap accessible. The seating capacity was reduced from 2,981 to 2,952 as a result.

In February 2023, due to upcoming renovations to the FirstOntario Centre, the Hamilton Bulldogs announced they would be temporarily relocating to the Civic Centre and renaming as the Brantford Bulldogs for at least three seasons, beginning in the 2023-24 OHL season. The Civic Centre will also be undergoing over $9 million in renovations, funded by both the Bulldogs and the City of Brantford.

Other events

It also served as a venue for live WWE events throughout the 1980s and early 1990s, including Maple Leaf Wrestling television shows on Hamilton station CHCH-TV.

References

External links
 Civic Centre — City of Brantford
 Brantford Civic Centre The OHL Arena & Travel Guide

Buildings and structures in Brantford
Indoor arenas in Ontario
Indoor ice hockey venues in Ontario
Ontario Hockey League arenas
Sports venues in Ontario
Sport in Brantford